Sealer Hill is a hill rising to 70 m in the southwest part of Byers Peninsula, Livingston Island in the South Shetland Islands, Antarctica.  It surmounts Nikopol Point and Sevar Point to the east-southeast and west-southwest, respectively.  The area was inhabited by 19th century sealers.

The feature was so named following geological work by BAS in 1975–76, from the presence of at least three crude stone huts built by sealers below the hill.

Location

Maps
 Península Byers, Isla Livingston. Mapa topográfico a escala 1:25000. Madrid: Servicio Geográfico del Ejército, 1992.
 L.L. Ivanov et al. Antarctica: Livingston Island and Greenwich Island, South Shetland Islands. Scale 1:100000 topographic map. Sofia: Antarctic Place-names Commission of Bulgaria, 2005.
 L.L. Ivanov. Antarctica: Livingston Island and Greenwich, Robert, Snow and Smith Islands. Scale 1:120000 topographic map.  Troyan: Manfred Wörner Foundation, 2009.

References
 SCAR Composite Antarctic Gazetteer.

Hills of Livingston Island